Tiécoro Keita (born 13 April 1994) is a Malian professional footballer who plays as a midfielder for Championnat National 2 club Fréjus Saint-Raphaël. He is a former Mali international.

Club career
Keita started his career at Guingamp in 2012, where he trained with the first team, but played for the reserves in Championnat de France Amateur 2. He was loaned to Vannes for six months at the start of 2014, and made his first team debut on 21 February 2014 against Fréjus Saint-Raphaël in the Championnat National.

In August 2014 he joined Paris FC, helping them to promotion from 2014–15 Championnat National to Ligue 2. He featured 30 times in Ligue 2, and when Paris FC were relegated at the end of the season, Keita stayed in Ligue 2, signing for Red Star.

International career
Keita represented the Mali under-20 national team four times at the 2013 African U-20 Championship. He also played at the 2013 FIFA U-20 World Cup, appearing three times.

Keita made his debut for the senior Mali national team in a 1–0 friendly loss to Nigeria on 27 May 2016.

References

External links
 

1994 births
Living people
Sportspeople from Bamako
Malian footballers
Mali international footballers
Association football midfielders
Ligue 2 players
Championnat National players
Championnat National 2 players
Championnat National 3 players
En Avant Guingamp players
Vannes OC players
Paris FC players
Red Star F.C. players
Les Herbiers VF players
ÉFC Fréjus Saint-Raphaël players
Malian expatriate footballers
Malian expatriate sportspeople in France
Expatriate footballers in France
21st-century Malian people